= Tarek Kour =

Algerian politician (born 1977)

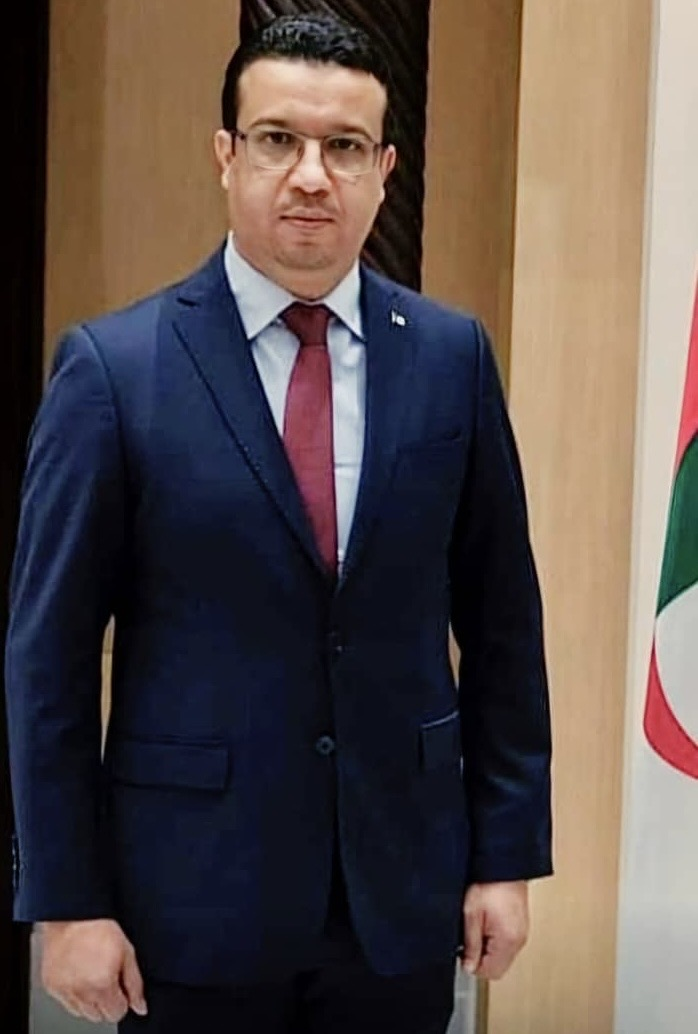
- Tarek Kour in 2021
- Born: Tarek Kour; April 18, 1977; Annaba
- Occupation: Politician
- Years active: 2003 - Today

ONPLC
- In office 2019–2021

Tarek Kour, an Algerian politician, was born on April 18, 1977, in the city of Annaba, in eastern Algeria. He is a judge and an Algerian official who has held several high-ranking positions in the justice sector. He also served as the head of the National Body for the Prevention and Fight Against Corruption, He has authored numerous books and publications.

== Professional career ==
Since 2019, Tarek Kour has served as the President of the National Body for the Prevention and Fight against Corruption (ONPLC) in Algeria, where he focuses on transparency initiatives, national strategies, digital platforms, and collaboration with civil society and governmental institutions. Prior to this role, from 2015 to 2019, he worked as a research judge at the Legal and Judicial Research Center in Algeria. Tarek was also the President of the Specialized Criminal Pole in Constantine from 2009 to 2014, and in 2014, he served as an advisor in the Indictment Chamber at the Court of Ouargla. Additionally, he has held positions as a judge in several courts across the provinces of Khenchela and Constantine.
